Panfilov is a village in Chüy Region of Kyrgyzstan. It is part of the Panfilov District. Its population was 8,636 in 2021.

Population

References

Populated places in Chüy Region